Creativity, Inc.: Overcoming the Unseen Forces That Stand in the Way of True Inspiration is a 2014 book, written by Edwin Catmull and Amy Wallace, about managing creativity in business.

As a co-founder of Pixar, Catmull discusses the environment and ideals he and his colleagues built at the company that made it so popular and profitable.

Background 
In the book, Catmull describes growing up idolizing Walt Disney, as well as moving to and growing up in Utah as a child.

Despite his interests in animation, he pursued studies in math, physics, and computer science in college, as a Ph.D. student at the University of Utah.

Eventually, this led him to a graduate degree under Ivan Sutherland, the "father of computer graphics," also at the University of Utah. Many decades before computer animation existed, Catmull began developing the programming to do 2D and 3D computer graphics. During this time, he was recruited to work at Lucasfilm, becoming vice president of Industrial Light and Magic's computer graphics division. In 1986, Steve Jobs bought that division and co-founded Pixar Animation Studios with Catmull and John Lasseter. There, Catmull soon became Chief Technical Officer.

Reception 

The New York Times said, "Catmull's book is quickly becoming the latest bible for the show business crowd." The book has also garnered positive reviews from The Wall Street Journal, Publishers Weekly, and Financial Times.

References

External links 
 

2014 non-fiction books
Business books
Books about creativity
Pixar
Transworld Publishers books